Monika Georgieva Gachevska (Bulgarian: Моника Георгиева Гачевска; born 30 January 1974 in Pleven) is a retired Bulgarian athlete who competed in the sprinting events. She represented her country at three consecutive Olympic Games, starting in 1996, as well as three outdoor and three indoor World Championships. Her biggest achievement is the bronze medal secured at the 1997 Summer Universiade.

Competition record

Personal bests
Outdoor
100 metres – 11.36 (+1.7 m/s) (Sofia 2002)
200 metres – 22.73 (+0.9 m/s) (Sofia 2004)
400 metres – 53.20 (Sofia 2004)
Indoor
60 metres – 7.32 (Budapest 1998)
200 metres – 23.43 (Budapest 1999)

References

1974 births
Living people
Sportspeople from Pleven
Bulgarian female sprinters
Olympic athletes of Bulgaria
Athletes (track and field) at the 1996 Summer Olympics
Athletes (track and field) at the 2000 Summer Olympics
Athletes (track and field) at the 2004 Summer Olympics
World Athletics Championships athletes for Bulgaria
Universiade medalists in athletics (track and field)
Universiade bronze medalists for Bulgaria
Medalists at the 1997 Summer Universiade
Olympic female sprinters
21st-century Bulgarian women
20th-century Bulgarian women